Philippine Airlines Flight 116 was a domestic flight operated by Philippine Airlines that departed from Francisco Bangoy International Airport in Davao to Manila International Airport. On May 21, 1976, six passengers stormed the plane and diverted it to Zamboanga Airport where it was met by the military and the police. Negotiations between the hijackers and the police continued until May 23, 1976, when authorities attempted to storm the plane. A gun battle broke out and grenades were thrown, setting it on fire. 10 passengers and 3 of the 6 hijackers died in the storming.

Background 
On May 21, 1976, the BAC One-Eleven operating as Flight 116 was cruising en route to Manila International Airport when six armed passengers stormed into the cockpit and demanded the pilots to divert to Zamboanga. The pilots agreed, and landed nearly an hour later. Upon landing, authorities found out about the situation and police were called to negotiate with the hijackers.

The hijackers demanded a ransom of $375,000 (PH₱ 19,897,500) and a plane to fly them to Libya. Negotiations lasted for a day while the police and military monitored the situation. At one point, there were plans that authorities would enter the plane disguised as the relatives of the hostages. The next day, 5 women and 9 children were released in exchange for food and water.

On May 23, two days after the hijacking, authorities stormed into the plane and a gun battle was ensued, which lasted for hours. Grenades exploded in the cabin, setting the plane on fire. Three hijackers and ten passengers were killed during the shooting while another 23 were injured, most of them during the evacuation. The three surviving hijackers were soon arrested and were executed by a firing squad.

The aircraft was written off.

Aircraft 
The aircraft was a BAC One-Eleven Series 500 manufactured in Hurn with a test registration of G-AYOS. Its first flight was in 1970 and was delivered to Philippine Airlines in 1971 as PI-C1161. In 1974 it was re-registered to RP-C1161.

References 

Aircraft hijackings in Asia
Philippine Airlines accidents and incidents
1976 in the Philippines
1976 disasters in the Philippines
Aviation accidents and incidents in the Philippines